Freedom Force may refer to:
 Freedom Force (comics), two teams in the Marvel Comics universe
 Freedom Force (video game), a video game for the Nintendo Entertainment System
 Freedom Force (2002 video game), a superhero game by Irrational Games
 The Freedom Force (TV series), a 1978 animated TV series
 Freedom Force, a militant group involved in insurgency in Jammu and Kashmir
 Freedom Force International, a group founded by G. Edward Griffin